Ugo Pigato (born 14 April 1968) is an Italian tennis coach and former professional player.

While competing on the professional tour in the late 1980s, Pigato reached best rankings of 373 in singles and 164 in doubles. He won an ATP Challenger doubles title in Geneva in 1989.

Pigato is now the director of the Milano Tennis Academy. He coaches his daughter, Lisa Pigato, who won the girls' doubles title at the 2020 French Open and plays on the WTA Tour.

ATP Challenger finals

Doubles: 3 (1–2)

References

External links
 
 

1968 births
Living people
Italian male tennis players
Italian tennis coaches